General elections were held for the first time in Republika Srpska on 14 September 1996. They were the first direct elections in Republika Srpska since its proclamation in 1992 and Bosnian War that ended in 1995. Previous National Assembly was created in 1991 and was made up of Serb MPs that were elected to the Socialist Republic of Bosnia and Herzegovina Parliament following 1990 Bosnian general election. Presidential election were held simultaneously because incumbent President Radovan Karadžić resigned in 1996 due to international pressure.

Biljana Plavšić, who succeeded Karadžić as Srpska's president, won absolute majority of votes, with Bosniak Adib Đozić finishing as runner-up. On parliamentary election, Plavšić's and Karadžić's Serb Democratic Party, that led Republika Srpska throughout Bosnian War, won and incumbent Prime Minister Gojko Kličković formed his second cabinet.

Results

President

Parliament

References

Elections in Republika Srpska
Republika